Open on All Sides in the Middle is an album by pianist Geri Allen recorded in late 1986 and released on the German Minor Music label.

Reception 

Allmusic reviewer Scott Yanow stated: "the material is comparatively lightweight for a Geri Allen recording, often only bordering on jazz". The Penguin Guide to Jazz described the album as an attempt to create "some new kind of song-based jazz", but labelled it "dire".

Track listing
All compositions by Geri Allen
 "Open on All Sides / The Glide Was in the Ride..." - 6:45	
 "Forbidden Place" - 4:24	
 "The Dancer" - 2:33	
 "In the Middle" - 4:01	
 "Ray" - 4:17	
 "I Sang a Bright Green Tear for All of Us This Year..." - 12:46	
 "Drummer's Song" - 2:24	
 "In the Morning" - 5:03	
 "The Dancer Part 2" 1:34

Personnel 
 Geri Allen - piano, keyboards, backing vocals
 Rayse Biggs - trumpet, flugelhorn
 Robin Eubanks - trombone
 David McMurray - soprano saxophone, flute
 Steve Coleman - alto saxophone
 Jaribu Shahid - bass 
 Tani Tabbal - drums
 Shahida Nurullah  - lead vocals
 Marcus Belgrave - flugelhorn (track 8)
 Mino Cinelu - cymbals, bells, congas, timbales, electronic drums, udu
 Lloyd Storey - tap dance

References 

1987 albums
Geri Allen albums
Vocal jazz albums